Chosei Kawakami (10 April 1895 – 1 September 1972) was a Japanese painter and print maker. He is better known as Sumio Kawakami. His work was part of the painting event in the art competition at the 1932 Summer Olympics.

Biography 
Kawakami was born in Yokohama, but his family moved to Tokyo when he was three. He learned to draw from Shôdai Tameshige (1863-1951) at the Aoyama Junior High School (Aoyama Gakuin Chûtôbu). He made his first print in 1912: and adaptation of a frontispiece drawn by the playwright Mokutarô Kinoshita (木下杢太郎 1885-1945) for a play called "Izumiya Dyeing Shop" (Izumiya somemono-ten: 和泉屋染物店). He was quite inventive:
To make his print — a woman with a traditional chignon hair-style who peers out from underneath a Western umbrella — Kawakami used a sharpened umbrella stay to carve the block. Moreover, he printed the inked block with a makeshift rubbing tool — an ashtray wrapped in a handkerchief.

He started to submit his works to a local journals starting from 1913. His mother, Koshige (小繁), died in 1915; probably because of this event he decided to move to Canada in 1917. He spent a year in Canada and the US, working at various jobs, that included a salmon cannery in Alaska and house painting in Seattle. He returned to Japan in 1918, when he learned that his younger brother, Washirô (和四郎), was dying. In Japan he worked for a time in an export firm; in 1921 he found a position of English teaher at Tochigi Prefectural Utsunomiya Junior High School (Utsunomiya Chûgakkô: 宇都宮中学校) in Kantô region. Kawakami's first "self-drawn, self-carved, self-printed" (jiga-jikoku-jizuri: 自画自刻自摺) book made in the "creative-print" (sôsaku hanga; 創作版画) manner was published in 1927. It was a collection of his poetry and woodcuts, titled "Bluebeard" (Aohige: 青髯). He then created more than 30 other books of woodcuts, which he mostly printed by himself.

In the early years, he developed a personal movable-type method for printing the texts by carving around 800 ideographs on individual small blocks of cherry wood (sakura: 桜 or 櫻), arranging the blocks within wood frames, and printing them with a traditional round rubbing pad (baren: 馬楝), just as he would do with his woodcut images.

Kawakami said he was mostly self-taught, though he had attended an art school in his childhood. His early woodcuts were made in the usual manner, "carving multiple blocks for the outlines and colors. He then adopted a method of carving only the keyblock while brushing on colors by hand." Besides of this, he frequently visited the workshop of Gôda Kiyoshi (合田清 1862-1938), who was skilled both in traditional woodcuts European techniques. (Gôda's son, Koichi 弘一, was a classmate of Kawakami's at Aoyama Gakuin High School.)

Oliver Statler quoted Kawakami saying: "I was never much in the swim of things as far as prints were concerned. Since I didn't live in Tokyo I never knew many of the print artists and never was much influenced by them. I've just gone my own way, doing what interested me, and hoping it would interest somebody else. If it has, I'm happy."

Kawakami was against Japanese militarism; during the Second World War he lost his job as the Ministry of Education banned the teaching of English language in schools. His main income at the time was from the sale of his books. "Former students also helped out financially, but he was reduced to burning his carved blocks for firewood." Kawakami moved in March 1945 to his wife Chiyo's (千代) home in Hokkaidô (北海道), "shortly before the Allied bombings began on April 18"; Hokkaidô was serving as an evacuation area at that time. In 1949 he resumed to teach English at Utsunomiya Girls' High School. In 1951 he, together with his students, started an art magazine called "Dull Blade" (Dontô: 鈍刀).

There is a Kawakami Sumio Graphic Art Museum in Kanuma, Tochigi prefecture (Kanuma Shiritsu Kawakami Sumio Bijutsukan: 鹿沼市立川上澄生美術館), established in 1992. The museum building was inspired by one of Kawakami's prints. There are more than 2000 works in its collection, donated Hasegawa Katsusaburô (長谷川勝三郎 1912-2001).

Further reading 
Ajioka, Chiaki; Kuwahara, Noriko; Nishiyama, Junko: Hanga: Japanese Creative Prints. Art Gallery of New South Wales, 2000, pp. 64 (nos. 3.7), 65 (3.11), 100.
National Museum of Modern Art, Tokyo — Catalogue of collections: prints (Tokyo Kokuritsu Kindai Bijutsukan — Shozô-in mokuroku (東京国立近代美術館 • 所蔵品目録). Tokyo: 1993, pp. 92–93, nos. 826-831.
Shiga, Hidetaka: Ki hanga no nukumori Kobayashi Kiyochika kara Munakata Shikô made (The warmth of woodblock prints: From Kobayashi Kiyochika to Munakata Shikô: 木版画のぬくもり小林清親から棟方志功まで). Tokyo: Fuchûshi Bijutsukan (Fuchû Art Museum: 府中市美術館), 2005, pp. 33–36, 61, and nos. 37-46, 118
Smith, Lawrence: The Japanese Print Since 1900: Old Dreams and New Visions. London: British Museum, 1983, pp. 36, 110, no. 87.

References

1895 births
1972 deaths
20th-century Japanese painters
Japanese painters
Olympic competitors in art competitions
People from Yokohama
Sosaku hanga artists